Perphenazine is a typical antipsychotic drug.  Chemically, it is classified as a piperazinyl phenothiazine. Originally marketed in the United States as Trilafon, it has been in clinical use for decades.

Perphenazine is roughly ten times as potent as chlorpromazine at the dopamine-2 (D2) receptor; thus perphenazine is considered a medium-potency antipsychotic.

Medical uses
In low doses it is used to treat agitated depression (together with an antidepressant). Fixed combinations of perphenazine and the tricyclic antidepressant amitriptyline in different proportions of weight exist (see Etrafon below). When treating depression, perphenazine is discontinued as fast as the clinical situation allows. Perphenazine has no intrinsic antidepressive activity. Several studies show that the use of perphenazine  with fluoxetine (Prozac) in patients with psychotic depression is most promising, although fluoxetine interferes with the metabolism of perphenazine, causing higher plasma levels of perphenazine and a longer half-life. In this combination the strong antiemetic action of perphenazine attenuates fluoxetine-induced nausea and vomiting (emesis), as well as the initial agitation caused by fluoxetine. Both actions can be helpful for many patients.

Perphenazine has been used in low doses as a 'normal' or 'minor' tranquilizer in patients with a known history of addiction to drugs or alcohol, a practice which is now strongly discouraged.

Perphenazine has sedating and anxiolytic properties, making the drug useful for the treatment of agitated psychotic patients.

A valuable off-label indication is the short-time treatment of hyperemesis gravidarum, in which pregnant women experience violent nausea and vomiting. This problem can become severe enough to endanger the pregnancy. As perphenazine has not been shown to be teratogenic and works very well, it is sometimes given orally in the smallest possible dose.

Effectiveness
Perphenazine is used to treat psychosis (e.g. in people with schizophrenia and the manic phases of bipolar disorder and OCD). Perphenazine effectively treats the positive symptoms of schizophrenia, such as hallucinations and delusions, but its effectiveness in treating the negative symptoms of schizophrenia, such as flattened affect and poverty of speech, is unclear. Earlier studies found the typical antipsychotics to be ineffective or poorly effective in the treatment of negative symptoms, but two recent, large-scale studies found no difference between perphenazine and the atypical antipsychotics. A 2015 systematic review compared perphenazine with other antipsychotic drugs:

Side effects
As a member of the phenothiazine type of antipsychotics, perphenazine shares in general all allergic and toxic side-effects of chlorpromazine.  A 2015 systematic review of the data on perphenazine conducted by the Cochrane Collaboration concluded that "there were no convincing differences between perphenazine and other antipsychotics" in the incidence of adverse effects. Perphenazine causes early and late extrapyramidal side effects more often than placebo, and at a similar rate to other medium-potency antipsychotics and the atypical antipsychotic risperidone.

When used for its strong antiemetic or antivertignosic effects in cases with associated brain injuries, it may obscure the clinical course and interferes with the diagnosis.  High doses of perphenazine can cause temporary dyskinesia.  As with other typical antipsychotics, permanent or lasting tardive dyskinesia is a risk.

Discontinuation
The British National Formulary recommends a gradual withdrawal when discontinuing antipsychotics to avoid acute withdrawal syndrome or rapid relapse. Symptoms of withdrawal commonly include nausea, vomiting, and loss of appetite. Other symptoms may include restlessness, increased sweating, and trouble sleeping. Less commonly there may be a feeling of the world spinning, numbness, or muscle pains. Symptoms generally resolve after a short period of time.

There is tentative evidence that discontinuation of antipsychotics can result in psychosis. It may also result in reoccurrence of the condition that is being treated. Rarely tardive dyskinesia can occur when the medication is stopped.

Pharmacology

Pharmacodynamics
Perphenazine has the following binding profile towards cloned human receptors unless otherwise specified:

Acronyms:
RS — Rat striatum receptor.
RB — Rat brain receptor.

Pharmacokinetics
Perphenazine has an oral bioavailability of approximately 40% and a half-life of 8 to 12 hours (up to 20 hours), and is usually given in 2 or 3 divided doses each day. It is possible to give two-thirds of the daily dose at bedtime and one-third during breakfast to maximize hypnotic activity during the night and to minimize daytime sedation and hypotension without loss of therapeutic activity.

Formulations
It is sold under the brand names Trilafon (single drug) and Etrafon/Triavil/Triptafen (contains fixed dosages of amitriptyline). A brand name in Europe is Decentan pointing to the fact that perphenazine is approximately 10-times more potent than chlorpromazine. Usual oral forms are tablets (2, 4, 8, 16 mg) and liquid concentrate (4 mg/ml).

The 'Perphenazine injectable USP' solution is intended for deep intramuscular (i.m.) injection, for patients who are not willing to take oral medication or if the patient is unable to swallow. Due to a better bioavailability of the injection, two-thirds of the original oral dose is sufficient. The incidence of hypotension, sedation and extrapyramidal side-effects may be higher compared to oral treatment. The i.m.-injections are appropriate for a few days, but oral treatment should start as soon as possible.

In many countries, depot forms of perphenazine exist (as perphenazine enanthate and perphenazine decanoate). One injection works for 1 to 4 weeks depending on the dose of the depot-injection. Depot-forms of perphenazine should not be used during the initial phase of treatment as the rare neuroleptic malignant syndrome may become more severe and uncontrollable with this form. Extrapyramidal side-effects may be somewhat reduced due to constant plasma-levels during depot-therapy. Also, patient compliance is sure, as many patients do not take their oral medication, particularly if feeling better once improvement in psychosis is achieved.

Interactions
Fluoxetine causes higher plasma levels and a longer elimination half-life of perphenazine, therefore a dose reduction of perphenazine might be necessary.

Perphenazine intensifies the central depressive action of drugs with such activity (tranquilizers, hypnotics, narcotics, antihistaminics, OTC-antiemetics etc.). A dose reduction of perphenazine or the other drug may be necessary.

In general, all neuroleptics may lead to seizures in combination with the opioid tramadol (Ultram).

Perphenazine may increase the insulin needs of diabetic patients. Monitor blood glucose levels of insulin-dependent patients regularly during long-term treatment.

References

Primary alcohols
Chloroarenes
CYP2D6 inhibitors
Dopamine antagonists
Phenothiazines
Piperazines
Sigma receptor ligands
Typical antipsychotics